The 2015 Sun Belt Conference men's soccer tournament was the 13th edition of the tournament, and the second since the conference reinstated the sport in 2013. It determined the Sun Belt Conference's automatic berth into the 2015 NCAA Division I Men's Soccer Championship.

The Hartwick Hawks won the tournament, defeating the Georgia State Panthers in the championship match.

Qualification 

The top five teams in the Sun Belt Conference based on their conference regular season records qualified for the tournament.

Bracket

Schedule

Play-in round

Semifinals

Championship

Statistical leaders

Top goalscorers

Tournament Best XI 

 Alex Beranger, Appalachian State
 Trey Hemphill, Appalachian State
 Emmanuel Raji, Georgia Southern
 Chase Park, Georgia Southern
 Rashid Alarape, Georgia State
 Nomas Cisic, Georgia State
 Amiri Abraham, Georgia State
 Dean Fowler, Hartwick
 Lenny Wilson, Hartwick
 Mike Rood, Hartwick
 Joshua Mercer, NJIT

See also 
 Sun Belt Conference
 2015 Sun Belt Conference men's soccer season
 2015 NCAA Division I men's soccer season
 2015 NCAA Division I Men's Soccer Championship

References 

Sun Belt Conference Men's Soccer Tournament
Sun Belt Conference Men's Soccer